Winter's Bone is a 2010 American coming-of-age mystery drama film directed by Debra Granik. It was adapted by Granik and Anne Rosellini from the 2006 novel of the same name by Daniel Woodrell. The film stars Jennifer Lawrence as a poverty-stricken teenage girl named Ree Dolly in the rural Ozarks of Missouri who, to protect her family from eviction, must locate her missing father. The film explores the interrelated themes of close and distant family ties, the power and speed of gossip, self-sufficiency, poverty, and patriarchy as they are influenced by the pervasive underworld of illegal meth labs.

The film won several awards, including the Grand Jury Prize: Dramatic Film at the 2010 Sundance Film Festival. It also received four Oscar nominations at the 83rd Academy Awards: Best Picture, Best Adapted Screenplay, Best Actress in a Leading Role for 20-year-old Lawrence (the second-youngest Best Actress nominee at the time) and Best Supporting Actor for John Hawkes. In addition, Lawrence was nominated for Best Actress – Motion Picture Drama and Outstanding Leading Actress at the 68th Golden Globe Awards and 17th Screen Actors Guild Awards, respectively.

Plot
In the rural Ozarks of Missouri, seventeen-year-old Ree Dolly looks after her mentally ill mother, Connie, twelve-year-old brother Sonny, and six-year-old sister Ashlee. She makes sure her siblings eat and teaches them survival skills such as hunting and cooking. The family is destitute. Ree's father, Jessup, has not been home for a long time; his whereabouts are unknown. He is out on bail following an arrest for manufacturing meth.

Sheriff Baskin tells Ree that if her father does not appear for his court date, they will lose the house because it was put up as part of his bond. Ree sets out to find her father. She starts with her meth-addicted uncle Teardrop and continues to more distant kin, eventually trying to talk to the local crime boss, Thump Milton. Milton refuses to see her; the only information Ree comes up with are warnings to leave the situation alone and stories that Jessup died in a meth lab fire or skipped town to avoid the trial.

When Jessup fails to appear for the trial, the bondsman comes looking for him and tells Ree that she has about a week before the house and land are seized. Ree tells him that Jessup must be dead, because "Dollys don't run". He tells her that she must provide proof that her father is dead to avoid the bond being forfeited.

Ree tries to go see Milton again and is severely beaten by the women of his family. Teardrop rescues Ree, promising her attackers that she will not cause more trouble. Teardrop tells Ree that her father was killed because he was going to inform on other meth cookers, but he does not know who killed him. He warns her that if she finds out who did, she must not tell him. Later, Ree talks to an Army recruiter about enlisting for the $40,000 bonus, but he tells her that she needs her parents' signatures to enlist and that she has the wrong reasons. On the way home from a bar, Ree and her uncle are stopped by the sheriff, who wants to question Teardrop. After a tense standoff, where Teardrop implies that he knows the Sheriff leaked that Jessup was an informer, Teardrop drives off.

A few nights later, the Milton women who beat Ree come to her house and offer to take her to "[her] daddy's bones". The women place a sack on her head and drive her to a pond, where they row to the shallow area where her father's submerged body lies. They tell Ree to reach into the water and grasp her father's hands so they can cut them off with a chainsaw; the severed hands will serve as proof of death for the authorities. Ree takes the hands to the sheriff, telling him that someone flung them onto the porch of her house.

The bondsman gives Ree the cash portion of the bond, which was put up by an anonymous associate of Jessup. Ree tries to give Jessup's banjo to Teardrop, but he tells her to keep it at the house for him. As he is leaving, he tells her that he now knows who killed her father. Ree reassures Sonny and Ashlee that she will never leave them. As the three sit on the porch, Ashlee begins to play the banjo.

Cast

Reception

Critical response
Winter's Bone received critical acclaim, with Jennifer Lawrence's performance being universally lauded. The film has an approval rating of 94% on Rotten Tomatoes, based on 177 reviews with an average score of 8.3/10. The website's critical consensus states: "Bleak, haunting, and yet still somehow hopeful, Winter's Bone is writer-director Debra Granik's best work yet — and it boasts an incredible, starmaking performance from Jennifer Lawrence." The film also has a score of 90 out of 100 on Metacritic based on reviews from 38 critics indicating "universal acclaim".

Roger Ebert gave the film 4 out of 4 stars, praising Lawrence's steely "hope and courage" that remains optimistic despite her tribulations, and calling attention to Granik's direction that avoids passing moral judgment on the characters or descending into stereotypes. Reviewer Peter Travers found the film "unforgettable", writing in Rolling Stone, "Granik handles this volatile, borderline horrific material with unblinking ferocity and feeling.... In Lawrence, Granik has found just the right young actress to inhabit Ree. Her performance is more than acting, it's a gathering storm." Critic James Berardinelli said that "Winter's Bone is a welcome reminder that thrillers don't have to be loud and boisterous to grab the attention and keep it captive." David Edelstein wrote in New York magazine, "For all the horror, it’s the drive toward life, not the decay, that lingers in the mind. As a modern heroine, Ree Dolly has no peer, and Winter’s Bone is the year’s most stirring film." New Yorker critic David Denby called Winter's Bone "one of the great feminist works in film".

Top ten lists
Winter's Bone was highly rated in many critics end-of-year lists, and Metacritic ranked it in second place for the year, only behind The Social Network. 

 1st – David Edelstein, New York
 1st – The A.V. Club
 1st – Keith Phipps, The A.V. Club
 1st – David Germain, Associated Press
 1st – Anne Thompson, Indiewire
 1st – David Fear, Time Out New York
 1st – Peter Hartlaub, San Francisco Chronicle
 2nd – David Ansen, Newsweek
 2nd – Betsy Sharkey, Los Angeles Times
 2nd – Noel Murray and Scott Tobias, The A.V. Club
 3rd – Christy Lemire, Associated Press
 3rd – Lisa Schwarzbaum, Entertainment Weekly
 3rd – Eric Kohn, Indiewire
 5th – Roger Ebert, Chicago Sun-Times
 5th – Joshua Rothkopf, Time Out New York
 6th – Tasha Robinson, The A.V. Club
 9th – Kirk Honeycutt, The Hollywood Reporter
 9th – Peter Travers, Rolling Stone
 10th – Kenneth Turan, Los Angeles Times
 10th – Claudia Puig, USA Today
 10th – Peter Rainer, Christian Science Monitor
 Top 10 (listed alphabetically) – Joe Morgenstern, The Wall Street Journal
 Top 10 (listed alphabetically) – David Denby and Anthony Lane The New Yorker
 Top 10 (listed alphabetically) – Carrie Rickey and Steven Rea Philadelphia Inquirer
 Top 10 (listed alphabetically) – Rick Groen and Liam Lacey The Globe and Mail

The Writers Guild Foundation listed the script as one of the best in 2010s film and television. The script was praised as "filled with really specific dialogue and mountain speak, which just makes everything more vivid."

Box office
 
Winter's Bone debuted in cinemas on June 11, 2010 in a limited release in 4 theaters and grossed "a hearty" $84,797, with an average of $21,199 per theater and ranking #35 at the box office. The film's subsequent outing and expansion to 39 theaters earned $351,317, with an  average of $9,008 per theater. The film's distributors Roadside Attractions aimed, concurrently with New York, Los Angeles and Boston, at "heartland cities" such as Minneapolis, Overland Park, St. Louis, Springfield, Dallas and Denver, which eventually all attracted significant audiences, surpassing New York's. According to the distributor, "the filmmakers had always wanted to deliver the movie to the people who helped them make it". The film was in cinemas for over 45 weeks and ultimately earned $6,531,503 domestically and $9,600,048 internationally for a total of $16,131,551, surpassing its $2 million budget.

Accolades
 

The film won the Grand Jury Prize: Dramatic Film and the Best Screenplay Award at the 2010 Sundance Film Festival. It also received two awards at the 2010 Berlin Film Festival in Germany and at the 2010 Stockholm International Film Festival, it won the awards for Best Film, Best Actress (Lawrence) and the Fipresci Prize.

Winter's Bone also won Best Feature and Best Ensemble Performance at the 2010 Gotham Awards and it earned seven nominations at the 2010 Independent Spirit Awards, including Best Film, Best Director, and Best Actress.

See also 
 Runoff (2014 film)

References

External links

 
 
 
 
  Interview with John Hawkes ("Teardrop") at Quietearth.us
 
 Moon, Michael and Colin Talley. "Life in a Shatter Zone: Debra Granik's Film Winter's Bone." Southern Spaces, December 6, 2010.

2010 films
2010 crime drama films
2010 independent films
2010s English-language films
2010s feminist films
American crime drama films
American independent films
Films about drugs
Films about dysfunctional families
Films about missing people
Films about poverty
Films based on American novels
Films directed by Debra Granik
Films set in Missouri
Films shot in Missouri
Films about poverty in the United States
American neo-noir films
Films set in the Ozarks
Roadside Attractions films
Sundance Film Festival award winners
2010s American films